The Church of Saint Silas the Martyr is a Church of England parish church in Kentish Town, London. The church is a grade II* listed building.

History
The church was built from 1911 to 1913, and designed by the architect Ernest Charles Shearman. The Church of St Silas replaced an earlier mission church. The building was funded through a £7,000 donation in the will of Henry Howard Paul, a wealthy American who had spent most of his career in the United Kingdom. The church was consecrated on 26 October 1912 by Arthur Winnington-Ingram, the then Bishop of London.

On 10 June 1954, the church was designated a grade II* listed building.

Present day
The church stands in the Anglo-Catholic tradition of the Church of England.

Gallery

References

External links
 Church website
 A Church Near You entry

Kentish Town
Kentish Town